Yekan-e Sadi (also Romanized as Yekān-e Sa‘dī; also known as Sa‘dī, Saiyid Ali, and Seyyed ‘Alī) is a village in Yekanat Rural District, Yamchi District, Marand County, East Azerbaijan Province, Iran. At the 2006 census, its population was 694, in 161 families.

References 

Populated places in Marand County